'Marrigudem is a Village and  Grampanchayat in Nalgonda mandal (Nalgonda district) in the Indian state of Telangana. The main source of income for the villagers is from Agriculture. The village is about 3 kilometers from Nalgonda (District Headquarters). As the village is very close to Nalgonda town, Villagers mostly depend on Dairy for livelihood. A Neighboring Village Girkabavigudem comes under Marrigudem Panchayithi election. Marrigudem Village has Government High School (Class 1 to 10).

The first citizen of Marrigudem village is its Sarpanch (President) who is elected every 5 years. The village is divided into 13 wards and each ward has its ward member elected every 5 years.

Notes

References 
 Marrigudem Village on Google map

Villages in Nalgonda district